The Bishopric of the Forces (in Great Britain) is a Latin Church military ordinariate of the Catholic Church which provides chaplains to the British Armed Forces based in the United Kingdom and their overseas postings.
 
It is directly exempt to the Holy See and its Roman Congregation for Bishops and is not part of any ecclesiastical province, whilst being a full member of the Catholic Bishops' Conference of England and Wales. The chaplains (padres) are drawn from the dioceses of England, Wales, Scotland, Ireland and the Commonwealth, as well as from some religious orders. Chaplains have spiritual and pastoral care of military personnel and their families.

Until 1986, they were called "military vicariates" and had a status similar to that of apostolic vicariates which are headed by a bishop who receives his authority by delegation from the Pope. The apostolic constitution Spirituali Militum Curae of 21 April 1986 raised their status, declaring that the bishop who heads one of them is an "ordinary", holding authority by virtue of his office, and not by delegation from another person in authority.

There is sometimes confusion between the holder of this Catholic post and the Anglican "Bishop to the Forces": for this reason the former is normally referred to as "the Roman Catholic Bishop of the Forces".

Offices and statistics 
The current Bishop of the Forces is the Rt Rev Paul Mason, who was appointed by Pope Francis on 9 July 2018. The Vicar General of the Bishopric and Dean of the Military Cathedral is Father Nick Gosnell. The chancellor of the Bishopric of the Forces is Rev. Neil Galloway.

The diocesan office and the episcopal see, the Cathedral of St Michael and St George (dedicated to traditional patron saints of chivalry and military), are located on Queens Avenue, Aldershot, Hampshire, England.

 it has 25 priests (23 diocesan, two religious), two deacons and two lay religious brothers.

History 

From 1917, individual titular bishops were appointed, twice, as Roman Catholic Bishops of the Forces.

On 21 November 1953, a permanent Military Vicariate of Great Britain was established, still always held by titular bishops.

On 21 July 1986, it was promoted as Military Ordinariate of Bishopric of the Forces in Great Britain, with its own Ordinary.

List of office holders

See also 

 Catholic Church in England and Wales
 
 Royal Air Force Chaplains Branch
 Royal Army Chaplains' Department
 Royal Navy Chaplaincy Service

References 

Spirituali militum curae (21 aprile 1986) | Giovanni Paolo II

Sources and external links 
 
 GCatholic, with Google satellite picture

British military appointments
Roman Catholic dioceses in the United Kingdom
Catholic Church in the United Kingdom
United Kingdom
United Kingdom

Christian organizations established in 1954
United Kingdom